James Samuel Younger  (born 5 October 1951) is a British media and charity manager.

Younger was managing director of the BBC World Service from 1994 to 1998, and chief executive of the British Red Cross from 1999 to 2001. He was the founding chairman of the United Kingdom Electoral Commission from 2001 to 2008 and the chief executive of the Charity Commission for England and Wales from September 2010 to April 2014.

He is also chair of the governing body of the University of Sussex and chairman of the Board of QAA.

He was appointed Commander of the Order of the British Empire (CBE) in the 2009 New Year Honours.

He has been chairman of the Consumers' Association Council since 1 January 2020.

Younger is the son of Kenneth Younger, a Labour Minister under Clement Attlee.

References

External links
An interview with Sam Younger
His initial views on the referendum

1951 births
Living people
Commanders of the Order of the British Empire
British civil servants